List of historical tekkes, zawiyas, and dergahs in Istanbul, Turkey:

Eyüp
Kaşgari Dergahı
Karyağdı Baba Bektaşi Dergahı
Çolak Hasan Dergahı ve İdris Köşkü
İdris Muhtefi Dergahı ve Zevki Sultan Namazgahı
Dolancı Mevlevihanesi
Hatuniye Dergahı
Bahariye Mevlevihanesi
Özbekler Kalenderhanesi
Abdulkerim Efendi Oluklubayır Dergahı
Hacı Ali Nakşi Dergahı
İslam Bey Bedevi Tekkesi
Haki Baba Dergahı
Kantari Baba Dergahı
Baba Haydar Zaviyesi
Şeyhulislam Mustafa Efendi Dergahı
Musa Çavuş Kirpasi Tekkesi
Ahmed Dede Dergahı
Ümmi Sinan Türbesi, Nasuh Efendi Tekkesi
Cemal Efendi Dergahı
İzzet Mehmed Paşa Nakşi Dergahı
Tamaşvar Defterdarı İbrahim Bey Tekkesi
Lagari Mehmed Efendi Taşlıburun Sa’di Dergahı
Şah Sultan Sünbüli Dergahı
Adile Sultan Dergahı
Hüsrev Paşa Dergahı
Mehmed Paşa Tekkesi
Cafer Paşa Tekkesi
Yahya Efendi Dergahı
Hasan Hüsnü Paşa Dergahı
Tahir Ağa Dergahı
Mahmud Efendi Kadiri Dergahı
Abdülmecid Sivasi Halveti Dergahı
Şeyh Murad Tekkesi
Sertarikzade Tekkesi
Kolancı Dergahı
Emir Buhari Nakşi Dergahı
Cemaleddin Uşşaki Asitanesi
Ahmed Efendi Alaca Tekkesi
Kolancı Şeyh Emin Baba Kuyubaşı Bektaşi Dergahı
Mustafa Selami Efendi Nakşi Dergahı
Mustafa Paşa Tekkesi
Balçık Sadiye Dergahı
Kılınçcı Baba Dergahı
Afife Hatun Balcı Dergahı
Haffaf Tekkesi
Ser Tekke
Ya Vedud (Hatice) Sultan Tekkesi
Tokmak Dede Tekkesi
Abdullah Ağa Dergahı

Eminönü
Şeyh Mehmed Geylani Bursa Tekkesi
Yıldız Dede Halveti Dergahı
Hoca Kasım Günani (Uşşaki) Zaviyesi
Safveti Paşa Nakşi Dergahı
Aydınzade Halveti (Hasan Ünsi) Dergahı
Sancaktar Baba (Abdurrahman Şami) Rifai Dergahı
Malatyalı İsmail Ağa Naziki (Mudanyalı-zade Nakşi) Dergahı
Erdebili Sinan Halveti Dergahı
Sultan Ahmet Tekkesi
Mısırlı (İbrahim Efendi Kadiri) Dergahı
Akbıyık Muhyiddin Efendi Halveti Dergahı
Düğümlü Baba Zaviyesi (Arabacıbaşı Dergahı)
Üçler Halveti (Bülbülcü-zade) Dergahı
Özbekler Nakşi Dergahı
Hindular Kalenderhanesi
Sokullu Mehmed Paşa Tekkesi
Şeyh Aziz Efendi Şeyhler Rufai Dergahı
Küçük Ayasofya Celveti Dergahı
İbrahim Paşa Sünbüli Dergahı
Saraç İshak Rufai Dergahı
Havuzlu Uşşaki Tekkesi
Baba Ali Şahzengi (Seyyid Hasan Efendi) Dergahı
Kadiri Dergahı
Çalak Halveti Dergahı
Hulusi Efendi Tekkesi
Hacı Beşir Ağa Nakşi Dergahı
Gümüşhaneli Ziyaeddin Efendi Nakşi Dergahı
Kaygusuz Baba Kadiri Dergahı
Havta Şazeli Dergahı
Kasım Çelebi Dergahı
Kara Baba Rufai Dergahı
Çorlulu Paşa Tekkesi
Hekim Çelebi Dergahı (Fazlullah Efendi Tekkesi)
Abdüsselam Sa’di Dergahı (Kovacı Tekkesi)
Çoban Çavuş Süleyman Ağa Dergahı
Alaca Mescid Rufai-Nakşi (Sadık Efendi) Dergahı
Musalla Tekkesi
Üsküplü Çakır Ağa Mercimek Dergahı (Kurşunlu Türbe Halveti Tekkesi) (Hacı Müştak, Esad Baba Dergahı)
Ali Çavuş-Altuncuzade Dergahı
Üryani (Üryani Baba Türbesi) Zaviyesi
Kalenderhane Camii
Keşfi Osman Efendi Celvetiyye Dergahı
Deruni Mehmed Efendi Nakşi Dergahı
Şeyh Helvai Rufai Dergahı
Pehlivanlar Tekkesi
Şeyh Vefa Dergahı
Süleymaniye Zaviyesi
Hilalci Tekkesi
Balıkpazarı Tekkesi

Fatih
Haydari Hüseyin Dede Kadiri Zaviyesi (Bekir Ağa Tekkesi)
Hoca Mübarek Tekkesi
Cism-i Latif (Gureba) Tekkesi
Sırraciye Dergahı
Kırkağaçlı Mehmed Emin Efendi Dergahı (Emin Ağa Tekkesi)
Hindular Kalenderhanesi
Yahya Efendi Nakşi Dergahı (İmam Sinan Tekkesi)
Osman Efendi Atpazarı Tekkesi (Kul Nakşi, Fazl-ı İlahi Dergahı)
Dülgerzade Dergahı
Ordu Şeyhi Halveti (Yesarizade, Hafız Efendi) Dergahı
Şeyh Alaaddin Celveti Dergahı
Sırrı Efendi (Kambur Mustafa Paşa) Dergahı (Kıztaş, Esrar Efendi Tekkesi)
Sofular Halveti Dergahı
Ebe Kadın (Şeyh Tevfik Efendi) Tekkesi
Feyzullah Efendi (Halıcılar, Şeyh Visali) Tekkesi
İsmail Efendi Tekkesi
Hasan Efendi Kadiri Dergahı (Sarıgüzel Tekkesi)
Kilise Sa’diyye (İsa) Dergahı
Muabbir Hasan Efendi Nakşi Dergahı (Kapı Halifesi, Ahmed Efendi Tekkesi)
Hüsrev Paşa Dergahı (Arif Efendi Rifai Tekkesi)
Çenezade Dergahı (Fındıkoğlu Tekkesi)
Çakırzade Dergahı
Emir Ahmed Buhari Asitanesi
Süleyman Efendi Halveti Dergahı (Sinan Ağa Tekkesi)
 Mehmed Emin Tokadi Tekkesi
Akşemseddin Dergahı (Semerci İbrahim Tekyesi)
Bakkalbaşı Tekkesi (Mustafa Dede Nakşi Dergahı)
Abid Çelebi (Şeyh Resmi) Tekkesi
Hacegi (İplikçi Hüsameddin) Tekkesi
Şeyh Resmi Kadiri Dergahı
Sivasi Halveti (Yavsi, Şemseddin Sivasi) Dergahı
Samanizade Ömer Hulusi Efendi Dergahı (Misli Ali Efendi Tekkesi)
Osman Efendi Halveti Dergahı
Kazasker (İsmail Hakkı) Tekkesi (Sarmaşık Dergahı)
Ayşe Hatun Zaviyesi (Resmi Tekkesi)
Mahmud Bedreddin Efendi Dergahı (Hazmi Efendi Tekkesi)
Kabakulak Kadiri (Mescitzade, Tahtaminare ve Mustafa Ahi Resmi) Dergahı
Karabaş Tekkesi
Halil Nizami Taşçı Halveti Dergahı
Acıçeşme Zaviyesi (Habbaz Muhyiddin, Ekmekçibaşı Tekkesi)
Nuri Efendi Zıbın-ı Şerif Tekkesi
Bekir Ağa Tekkesi
Ejder Efendi Sa’di Dergahı (Mehmed Sıdkı Efendi Tekkesi)
Ahmed Kamil Efendi Nakşi Dergahı
Mehmed Şemseddin Efendi Dergahı (Muhyi Efendi Tekkesi)
Muameleci Şeyh Tekkesi (Ümmi Kenan Rifai Dergahı)
Salih Efendi Tekkesi
Zekaizade Halveti Dergahı
Mehmed Ağa Dergahı (Bayram Veli, Yayabaşı Tekkesi)
Rakım Efendi Nakşi Dergahı
Dırağman Nakşi Dergahı (Tercüman Yunus, İsazade Salih Efendi Tekkesi)
Keşfi Efendi Nakşi (Kefeli) Dergahı
Kurt Ağa Tekkesi
Nureddin Cerrahi Asitanesi
Kayserili Tekkesi
Boyalı Mehmed Paşa Dergahı (Bülbülcüzade Tekkesi)
Koğacı Dede Tekkesi
Hamza Efendi Halveti Dergahı
Başmakçı Tekkesi
Keskin Dede Zaviyesi
Sertarikzade Halveti Dergahı
Mehmed Arif Efendi Dergahı
Sirkeci Sünbüli Dergahı (Yorgani, Ebulfeth Gazi Tekkesi)
Karasarıklı İbrahim Efendi Dergahı
Ağa Şeyh Tekkesi
Said Çavuş Ata Efendi Dergahı (Şeyh Raşid, Şeyh Murad ve Müfti Hamamı Tekkesi)
Abdülhalim Efendi Dergahı (Şeyh Halim Efendi, Yeşil Tulumba Tekkesi)
Mehmed Efendi Dergahı
Emir Buhari Nakşi Dergahı
Nalıncı Memi Dede (Şeyh Kapani) Zaviyesi
Şazeli Ahmed Dergahı
Muhyiddin Kocevi Zaviyesi
Hıfzi Efendi Zaviyesi
İsmet Efendi Zaviyesi
Refet Efendi Halveti Zaviyesi (Lokmacı Tekkesi)
Mesnevihane Camii Mesnevi Dergahı
Murad Molla Nakşi Dergahı
Mustafa Efendi (Şeyh Kamil Efendi) Dergahı (Kadı Sadi Efendi, Kesmekaya ve Şimşekler Tekkesi)
Çakır Ağa Sa’di Dergahı
(Yazıcızade) Hulusi Efendi Dergahı
Sami Efendi Tekkesi
Battal Gazi Dergahı
Nakşibendi Dergahı
Hakiki Osman Efendi Halveti Dergahı (Çuhadar Tekkesi)
Gürcü Şeyh Ali Efendi Gülşeni Dergahı
Ferruh Kethüda Tekkesi (Balat Zaviyesi)
Hazreti Cabir Zaviyesi
Çınarlı Tekke
Yatağan Kadiri Dergahı (Hacı İlyas, Şeyh Ömer Tekkesi)
Toklu İbrahim Dede Zaviyesi (Şeybetü’l Hudri Tekkesi)
İvaz Efendi Kadiri Dergahı
Emir Buhari Nakşi Dergahı (Şeyh Selim Tekkesi)
Kuşadalı İbrahim Efend Asitanesi (Şamiler Tekkesi)
Hafid Efendi Tekkesi
Masum Efendi Tekkesi
Cafer Ağa Tekkesi
Kara Nohut Rufai Dergahı (Sülüklü, Sülüklü Çeşme ve Erzurumlu Fazıl Efendi Rufai Tekkesi)
Oğlan Şeyh İbrahim Efendi Dergahı
Hacı Bayram-ı Kaftani (Tavil Mehmed Efendi, Edhemler ve Tekirdağlı Mustafa Paşa) Tekkesi
Rabia Hatun Zaviyesi
Tokmaklı Bostan, Ekrem Efendi ve Hamidiye Tekkesi
Kara Mehmed Paşa Sünbüli Dergahı
Sancaktar Hayreddin Sa’di Dergahı (Şahbaz Paşa Tekkesi)
İnebey Dergahı
Yunus Efendi Tekkesi
Küçükzade Dergahı
Zıbın-ı Şerif Tekkesi
Doğanlı Baba Tekkesi
Keyçi Hatun (Taştekneler, Yalaklar Kadiri) Dergahı
Bayrampaşa Başmak-ı Şerif (Baba Efendi) Dergahı
Bekar Bey (Mehmed Kamil Efendi) Tekkesi
Şeyh Canib (Sa’di) Dergahı
Abayi Tekkesi
Mimar Sinan Halveti Dergahı (Baba Saltuk, Sarı Saltuk Tekkesi)
Kubbe Dergahı
Hocazade Dergahı
Aşık Paşa Dergahı (Yusuf Sinan Zaviyesi)
Seyyid-i Velayet Tekkesi
Tahir Ağa Dergahı (Selahaddin Uşşaki Tekkesi)
Şeyh Bedreddin Tekkesi
Saçlı Efendi Çırakçı (Şeyh Labib Efendi, Tarakçı) Tekkesi (Kılcı Dergahı)
Şeyh Murad Tekkesi (Yeni Tekke)(Raşid Efendi Dergahı)
Mecidiye Zaviyesi (Şerif Kuddusi Nakşi Dergahı)
Tarsus Rufai Dergahı (Kokçüzade Tekkesi)
Bala Süleyman Ağa Nakşi Dergahı
(Zerdeci Şeyh Hüseyin Efendi) Karagöz Halveti Tekkesi
Örümcekli Dede Tekkesi
Peyk Dede Kadiri Dergahı
Seyfullah Efendi Emirler Tekkesi
Üçler Dergahı
Alyanak Dergahı (Zehgirci Kemal Tekkesi)
Mehmed Emin Efendi Tekkesi
Mimar Acem Dergahı
Şevki Efendi Dergahı
Ciğerci Baba Dergahı
Kal’adibli Dergahı
Kılınçcı Baba Tekkesi (Kalaycı Tekke)
Kolancı Baba Tekkesi
Kırımlı Hasan Efendi Tekkesi (Kırımi Halveti Dergahı)
Vasfi Efendi Tekkesi
Hasan Kudsi Efendi Dergahı
Şeyh Matrak Sa’di (Arabzade, Odabaşı, Şeyh Izzi ve Hasan Kutbi) Tekkesi
Ahiler (Safvet Efendi Ahiler Vacid) Dergahı
Gavsi Efendi Kadiri Dergahı (Aydın Kethüda, Numan Efendi Tekkesi)
Kelami (Esad Efendi) Dergahı
Yakubzade Tekkesi
Ebul Huda (Ahmed Safi) Tekkesi
Ceylanlı Tekkesi
Hulvi Mahmud Dede (Şirvani) Dergahı
Deniz Abdal Kadiri Dergahı
Remli Mehmed Efendi Dergahı (Sırrizade, Kolancı ve Karakullukçu Tekkesi)
Başçı Mahmud Gülşeni Dergahı (Said Efendi Tekkesi)
Seydi Baba Nakşi Dergahı (Osman Baba Tekkesi)
Nureddin Hakkı Efendi Dergahı
Piri Mehmed Paşa Koruk Tekkesi
Mahmud Taha Efendi Kadiri Dergahı
Beşikçizade M. Süleyman Efendi Dergahı (Çavuş Hamam Tekkesi)
(Yahya Efendi) Yolgeçen Tekkesi
Şeyh Halil Efendi Kadiri Dergahı
Cündi Hürrem Dergahı (Yakubzade Tekkesi)
Seyyid Halife Halveti Dergahı (Kız Ahmed Efendi Tekyesi)
Fenayi Tekkesi
Şerbettar Rifai Dergahı (Elvan Efendi, Elvanzade, Numan Efendi Tekkesi)
Vani (Kürkçü) Dergahı (Lalezar Tekkesi)
Kadızade Mehmed Kadiri Dergahı (Altıpatlar, Haffafzade Şeyh Süleyman Efendi, Haffaf Mehmed Efendi Kadiri Tekkesi)
Şeyh Ahmed Efendi Dergahı
Himmetzade Bayrami Dergahı
Fındıkzade Hacı Ahmed Efendi Dergahı
Alaybeyi Tekkesi
Ketenci Baba Tekkesi
Rukiye Hatun Tekkesi
Koruk Rifai (Abdullah, Şakir Efendi) Dergahı (Odabaşı, Koruk Tekkesi)
Şeyh Raşid Efendi Sa’di Dergahı (İnadiye Salı Tekkesi)
Hariri Mehmed Efendi Dergahı (Salih Efendi, Pazar Tekkesi)
Ümmi Sinan Asitanesi (Zekaizade Tekkesi)
Arpacı Tekkesi (Şamlı Hasan Efendi Sa’di Dergahı)
Yavaşca Mehmed Ağa (Nazım Efendi) Dergahı
Müneccim Sa’di Efendi Gülşeni Dergahı
Gazi Kara Ahmed Paşa Zaviyesi
Kıllı Yusuf Cumartesi (Berberler Şeyhi) Tekkesi (Berberler Şeyhi Seyyid Osman Efendi Rifai Dergahı)
Çivizade Mehmed Efendi Dergahı
Bedreddinzadeler Sünbüli Dergahı
Hacı Kadın Halveti Dergahı
Mirahur İlyas Bey Halveti Dergahı (Şeyh Vahyi Tekkesi)
Hüseyin Ağa (Arabkuyusu) Tekkesi
Şeyh Emin Kadiri Dergahı
Halid Efendi Uşşaki Tekkesi
Gümüş Baba (Taşçıbaşı, Şeyh İbrahim Efendi) Kadiri Tekkesi
Kuledibi Dergahı
Hamid Ağa Tekkesi
Etyemez Mirza Baba Sünbüli Dergahı (Karabacak Veli Tekkesi)
Kadem-i Şerif Sa’di Dergahı (Halil Hamid Paşa Tekkesi)
Abdal Yakub Dede (Hekimoğlu Ali Paşa) Dergahı
Lamekani (Hüseiyn Efendi) Zaviyesi
Erdi Baba Dergahı
Bebek Dede Dergahı
Sünbül Efendi Asitanesi
Nuh Efendi Tekkesi
Kadı Efendi Ağaçkakan (Feyzi Efendi, Nail Efendi Bedevi) Dergahı
Ağa Çayırı Safveti Sünbüli Dergahı (Ağaçayırı, Kasım Çavuş, Çayır Tekkesi)
Ahmed Niyazi Efendi Dergahı
Hacı Evhad Sünbüli Dergahı
Feyziye (Küçük Efendi) Tekkesi (Feyzüddin Efendi Nakşi Dergahı)
Ramazan Efendi Asitanesi (Bezirgah Hüsrev Çelebi Halveti Dergahı)
Körükcü (Kürkçü) Tekke
Öksüzce Baba Dergahı (Akarca Tekkesi)

Zeytinburnu
Merkez Efendi Sünbüli Dergahı
Alemdar (Bayrak Dede Alemdar, Sancaktar) Zaviyesi
Yenikapı Mevlevihanesi
Duhani Mahmud Efendi Şaban Ağa Tekkesi
Bayram Dede Tekkesi
Seyyid Nizam Şabani Dergahı
Arakıyeci İbrahim Efendi Halveti Dergahı
Abdullah Baba Bektaşi Dergahı
Perişan Ali Baba Zakirbaşı Dergahı

Büyükçekmece
Nasuhi Dede Tekkesi

Beyoğlu
Gül Baba Dergahı
Tomtom Mescidi Tekkesi
Galata Mevlevihanesi
Okçu Baba (Musa Baba) Dergahı
Mustafa Efendi Bedevi Dergahı
Paşa Baba (Hocazade Rufai) Dergahı
İsmail Rumi Kadiri Asitanesi
Karabaş Mustafa Ağa Dergahı
Hasan Burhaneddin Cihangiri Asitanesi
Kurşunlu Mahzen Zaviyesi
Nebati Efendi Kadiri Dergahı
Ali Dede Tekkesi
Tatar Efendi Gülşeni Dergahı
Çavuşbaşı Tekkesi
İlyas Çelebi Akarca Zaviyesi
Keşfi Cafer Efendi Dergahı (Nebi Efendi Tekkesi)
Canfeda Tekkesi
Said Efendi Dergahı
Ali Baba Ayaspaşa Tekkesi
Hacı Kılıç Tekkesi
Kantari Baba Sadiyye Dergahı
Çizmeciler Tekkesi
Çakır Dede Nakşi Zaviyesi (Karaabalı Tekkesi)
Okçular Tekkesi
Sinan Paşa Tekkesi
Hamdi Efendi Dergahı
Kasımpaşa Mevlevihanesi
Ayni Ali Baba Kadiri Zaviyesi
Seki (Gülşen) Dede Tekkesi
Ahmed Safai Efendi (Yanık Şeyh) Tekkesi
Piyale Paşay-ı Kebir Kadiri Dergahı
Muabbir Hasan Efendi Kadiri (Arabacılar) Dergahı
Turabi Baba Dergahı
Ciğerim Dede Sadi Dergahı
Ali Efendi Arabzade Mustafa Efendi Bedevi Dergahı (Şeyh Mustafa Tekkesi)
Şeyh Cevheri Sadi Dergahı
Kalafatçı Yusuf (Hamdi Efendi) Tekkesi
Yahya Kethuda (Kasım Çavuş Halveti, Yusuf Çavuş ve Yahya Baba) Dergahı
Piyale-i Sağır Kurt Bey Kadiri Zaviyesi
Divanhane Dergahı
Eburrıza Mehmed Efendi Dergahı
Doğramacı Dergahı (Badula Tekkesi)
Muarrifi Rifai Dergahı
Ali Kuzu (Bedreddin) Tekkesi (Çürüklük Dergahı)
Haşimi Osman Efendi Bayrami Dergahı (Emir Efendi Tekkesi)
Hüsameddin Uşşaki Asitanesi
Mehmed Çavuş Tekkesi
Turşucu Tekkesi
Zincirli Tekkesi
Çıksalın Tekkesi (Çıksalın Kadiri Dergahı)
Abdüsselam Efendi Dergahı (Fıstıklı, Taşcı Tekkesi)
İshak Karamani (Uyuni) Tekkesi
Hasirizade Sadi Dergahı
Münir Baba Dergahı (Bademli Tekke)(Caferabad, Şahkulu ve Şeyh Murad-ı Buhari Nakşi Zaviyesi)

Kağıthane
Karaağaç Bektaşi Dergahı
Abdüssamed Efendi Bayrami Dergahı
Yeniçeriler Tekkesi
Tahta Kadı Zaviyesi

Beşiktaş
Mehmed Niyazi Efendi Kadiri Dergahı
Durmuş Dede Dergahı
Şeyh Zafiri Dergahı
Ebulhüda Dergahı (Sayyadiye Tekkesi)
Beşiktaş Mevlevihanesi
Neccarzade Nakşi Tekkesi
Ahmed Turani Sungur Baba Nakşi Zaviyesi
Muhyiddin Efendi Şabani Zaviyesi (Şeyh İhsan Efendi, Maçka Tekkesi)
Yahya Efendi Nakşi Dergahı

Sarıyer
Tezveren Baba Dergahı
Nalbant Mehmed Efendi Nakşi Dergahı (Nalburi Tekkesi)
Karabaş Halveti Dergahı
Nafi Baba Bektaşi (Şehidlik) Tekkesi
Haffaf Hüseyin Efendi Kadiri Dergahı
İsmail Efendi Halveti (Raufi) Dergahı
Sarı Baba Nakşi Dergahı

Beykoz
Akbaba Dergahı
Yuşa Tepesi Nakşibendi Dergahı
Şeyh Kadir Efendi Nakşibendi Tekkesi (Serviburnu Tekkesi)
Serbostani (Mehmed Kethüda Halveti) Tekkesi
Çayır (Şeyh Edhem Sırrı Efendi) Tekkesi
Şeyh Ahmed Efendi Bedevi Dergahı
Hafız Efendi (Mehmed Tevfik Efendi, Şamiler) Tekkesi
Şabani Dergahı
Ubeydullah Efendi Nakşibendi Tekkesi
Ataullah Efendi Nekşibendi Dergahı
Nazif Dede Nakşi Dergahı (Anadoluhisarı Tekkesi)

Üsküdar

Fatma Adaviyye Dergahı (Şeyh Ahmet Efendi Bedevi Tekkesi)
Mustafa İzzet Efendi Settariye Dergahı (Şeyh Hamil, Abdullah Ağa Tekkesi)
Şeyh Nevruz Tekkesi (Kadiri Afgan Kalenderhanesi)(Havuzbaşı Özbekler Tekkesi)
İstavroz Bedevi Kalenderhanesi (Şeyh Hüseyin Hıfzı Efendi Dergahı)(Beylerbeyi Bedevi Tekkesi)
Kazım Efendi Tekkesi
Yarımca Dede Baba Dergahı
Selami Ali Efendi Asitanesi
Musalla Dergahı
Nur Baba Bektaşi Dergahı
Özbekler Tekkesi (Hacı Hoca Nakşi Dergahı)
Mihrimah Sultan Zeviyesi (Şeyh Celaleddin Efendi Rifai Tekkesi)
Toygartepe (Saçlı Hüseyin Efendi) Dergahı
Selim Baba Nakşi Dergahı (Şeyh Sadık Efendi Tekkesi)
Feyzullah Efendi Kalenderhanesi
Selami Ali Efendi Selamiye Dergahı
Selami Ali Efendi Acıbadem Dergahı
Şeyh Devati Dergahı
Balaban Tekkesi
Aziz Mahmud Hüdai Asitanesi (Aziz Mahmud Hüdai Bacılar Celveti Tekkesi)
Halil Paşa Zaviyesi (Kapıcı Tekkesi)
Üsküdar Mevlevihanesi
Ayşe Sultan Tekkesi
Nasuhi Mehmed Efendi Asitanesi
Safvet Efendi Şabani Dergahı (Ahmed Paşa, Kaz Deresi Tekkesi)
Etmek Yemez Bayrami Dergahı
Raufi Efendi Asitanesi
Selimiye Hankahı
Hafız İsmail Efendi Dergahı
Miskinler Tekkesi
Keşfi Ahmed Efendi Dergahı
Avni Efendi Kadiri Dergahı
Himmet Efendi Asitanesi (Himmetzade Salı Dergahı)
Kıncı Baba Tekkesi
Mehmed Arif Dede Dergahı (Kapıağa Tekkesi)
Kurban Nasuh Rifai Dergahı (Nuri Efendi, Çarşamba Tekkesi)
Hallaç Baba Sa’di Dergahı
Atpazari Osman Efendi Dergahı
İbrahim Edhem Efendi Dergahı (Sandıkçı Tekkesi)
Karabaş Veli Asitanesi
Kavsara Mustafa Efendi Halveti Dergahı
Acıbadem Dergahı
Çamlıcalı Mehmed Efendi Dergahı (Çınarlı Tekke)
Seyfeddin Efendi Sa’di Dergahı
Hacı Dede Nakşi (Sadık Efendi) Dergahı
Kartal Baba Kadiri Dergahı
Fenai Ali Efendi Asitanesi
Ümmi Ahmed Efendi Şabani Dergahı
Afganlar Kalenderhanesi (Numan Bey Tekkesi)
Hasib Efendi Bedevi Dergahı
Balcı Dede Dergahı
Nalçacı Halil Efendi Şabani Dergahı (Tului Tekkesi)
Halim Gülüm Kadiri Dergahı (Zincirlikuyu Tekkesi)
Feyzullah Efendi Dergahı
Abdullah Efendi Nakşi Dergahı (Şeyh Selim Tekkesi)
Tombul Mehmed Efendi Tekkesi (Tombul Mehmed Efendi Halveti Dergahı)
Külhancı Baba Dergahı
Ahmed Sıtkı Efendi Tekkesi
Saçlı Hüseyin Efendi (Şah Nurullah, Şeyh Nurullah) Dergahı
Ahmediye Rifai Dergahı
Şemseddin Efendi Tekkesi
Feyzullah Efendi Dergahı (Rumi Efendi Tekkesi)
Şeyh Fethi Sa’di Dergahı
İskender Baba Kaymakçı Tekkesi
Yusuf Rıza Efendi Rifai Asitanesi
Haşim Baba Asitanesi (Bandırmalı Yusuf Nizam Dergahı)
Osman Efendi Tekkesi
Bali Çavuş Zaviyesi
Karaca Ahmet Sultan Tekkesi
Acemler Dergahı
Sarıgazi Zaviyesi

Kadıköy
Gözcü Baba Ribatı
Şahkulu Dergahı
Abdulhalim Efendi Dergahı
Ayşe Sıddıka Hanım Mecidiye (Abdulbaki Efendi, Kuşdili Hamidiye Sa’di) Dergahı
İbrahim Ağa Mustafa Efendi Kadiri Dergahı

Kartal
Ali Sabit Efendi Rifai Muarrifi Dergahı
Mustafa Ağa Kadiri Dergahı (Yakacık Tekkesi)
Halveti Mustafa Efendi Dergahı (Vezir Tekkesi)
Daver Baba Tekkesi

References

Istanbul
Islamic education in Turkey
Education in Istanbul
Sufism
Mosques in Istanbul
Istanbul
Istanbul